Tikrit Sport Club, is an Iraqi football team based in Tikrit, Saladin, that plays in Iraq Division Three.

Managerial history
 Mohammed Saeed
 Arkan Ibrahim
 Dhiaa Khalil
 Saad Jabor Khalifa

See also 
 2020–21 Iraq FA Cup
 2021–22 Iraq FA Cup

References

External links
 Tikrit SC on Goalzz.com
 Iraq Clubs- Foundation Dates

2019 establishments in Iraq
Association football clubs established in 2019
Football clubs in Saladin